The DJ 6 in the Mix is the 6th volume from "The DJ in the Mix" series mixed by the German DJ ATB. It was released by Kontor Records on 31 December 2010 and it features tracks produced by George Acosta, Amurai, Andy Duguid, The Thrillseekers, Andain and many more.

The compilation is structured on 3 CDs - CD 1 & 2 contain tracks that ATB is currently spinning during his gigs and the 3rd CD is compiled of tracks that André liked and enjoyed during his career as a DJ as well as producer.

Track listing

CD 1
 Twisted Love
 George Acosta feat. Fisher - Love Rain Down
 Shogun feat. Susie - Come With Me
 Dash Berlin with Cerf, Mitiska & Jaren - Man On The Run [Nic Chagall Remix]
 Filo & Peri feat. Audrey Gallagher - This Night [Max Graham Mix]
 Amurai feat. Rough Duchess - Infinity
 AMEX - Closer
 Andy Duguid feat. Leah - Miracle Moments
 Julie Thompson - Shine [JPL & George Hales Remix]
 Ruben de Ronde - Forever In Our Hearts [Danny Chen Remix]
 Skytech - Rocket Science
 Shipstad & Warren - I'm Never Alone
 Juventa - Only Us

CD 2
 Sneijder - Away From Here [Arty Remix]
 Disfunktion - Magna
 EDX & Tamra Keenan - Out Of The Rain [Sebastian Krieg & Roman F. Arena Mix]
 Phil Fuldner - Spyderman
 Tim Berg, Oliver Ingrosso, Otto Knows - iTrack
 The Thrillseekers - Synaesthesia [Vegas Baby! Remix]
 Josh Gallahan - Sunday Afternoon
 Soarsweep - Madarika Beach
 Marsbeing - Open Your Eyes
 Schodt - You & Me
 Tom Fall & Somethings Good - Reflections [Sundriver Remix]
 T.O.M. - Monsoon [Jason Van Wyk Remix]
 Ferry Tayle - The Prestige [Temple One Pres. Tu Casa Remix]
 Matt Millon - Tattoo

CD 3
 Ecstasy [Special US Intro Mix]
 Max Graham feat. Ana Criado - Nothing Else Matters [Aly & Fila Remix]
 Oliver Smith - Cirrus
 Alex Bartlett feat. Anthya - Touch The Sun [Duende Dub Remix]
 Luminary - Amsterdam [Smith & Pledger Remix]
 Akesson - Perfect Blue
 Rusch & Murray - Epic [Above & Beyond Remix]
 Andain - Beautiful Things [Gabriel & Dresden Unplugged Mix]
 First State feat. Anita Kelsey - Falling
 Signalrunners & Julie Thompson - These Shoulders [Oliver Smith Remix]
 Sundriver - Feel [Nitrous Oxide Remix]
 Above & Beyond vs. Andy Moor - Air For Life

ATB albums
DJ mix albums
2010 compilation albums